The former Kingdom of Kerma in Nubia, was a province of ancient Egypt from the 16th century BCE to eleventh century BCE. During this period, the polity was ruled by a viceroy who reported directly to the Egyptian Pharaoh. It is believed that the Egyptian 25th Dynasty were descendants of these viceroys, and so were the dynasties that ruled independent Kush until the fourth century CE.

The 'King's Son of Kush' ruled the area north of the Third Cataract. The area was divided into Wawat in the north, centered at Aniba, and Kush in the south, centered at Soleb during the Eighteenth Dynasty of Egypt and then Amara West. The title lapsed under Paiankh.  Pinedjem II named one of his wives 'Superintendent of Southern Foreign Lands and Viceroy Kush'.

List of Viceroys
Below is a list of viceroys mainly based on a list assembled by George Reisner.

See also
Kingdom of Kush

References

Further reading
 George A. Reisner, The Viceroys of Ethiopia, The Journal of Egyptian Archaeology, Vol. 6, No. 1 (Jan., 1920), pp. 28–55.
 George A. Reisner, The Viceroys of Ethiopia (Continued), The Journal of Egyptian Archaeology, Vol. 6, No. 2 (Apr., 1920), pp. 73–88.

 
Viceroys of Kush
Ancient Egyptian titles
Kerma culture